1908 Országos Bajnokság I (men's water polo) was the fifth waterpolo championship in Hungary. There was only one participant, who thus won the champion without any match.

Sources
Gyarmati Dezső: Aranykor (Hérodotosz Könyvkiadó és Értékesítő Bt., Budapest, 2002.)

1908 in water polo
1908 in Hungarian sport
Seasons in Hungarian water polo competitions